The Breckwoldt-Ward House is a historic house located at 90 Van Buren Street in Dolgeville, Herkimer County, New York.

Description and history 
It was built in 1893, and is an asymmetrically massed, -story Queen Anne–style single family dwelling over a cut-stone foundation. Also on the property is a -story, gable-roofed carriage house/garage. From 1903 to 1918 it was owned by George Ward, successful prosecutor in the Chester Gillette murder trial of 1906.

It was listed on the National Register of Historic Places on March 15, 2005.

Currently, it is a private residence.

References

Houses on the National Register of Historic Places in New York (state)
Queen Anne architecture in New York (state)
Houses completed in 1893
Houses in Herkimer County, New York
National Register of Historic Places in Herkimer County, New York